The 6th Bengal European Regiment was an infantry regiment of the British East India Company, created in  and disbanded in .

The regiment was raised in Bengal by the East India Company in 1858, for service in the Indian Mutiny; the "European" in the name indicated that it was composed of white soldiers, not Indian sepoys. The regiment was composed of officers drawn from two Indian units which had mutinied, the 7th Bengal Native Infantry and 8th Bengal Native Infantry. 

As with all other "European" units of the Company, they were placed under the command of the Crown following the end of the Mutiny in 1858. The regiment was reduced to cadre strength in 1861, and disbanded in 1867.

References
6th Bengal European Regiment, regiments.org

British Indian Army infantry regiments
Honourable East India Company regiments
Military units and formations established in 1858
Military units and formations disestablished in 1867
Bengal European
Bengal Presidency
Bengal European Infantry